Kagssagssuk Maniitsoq is a sports club from Greenland based in Maniitsoq. They compete in the Coca Cola GM.

Achievements 
Coca Cola GM: 1
Champion : 1989

External links
 Greenland Football Association Official website
 The Remotest Football website

Football clubs in Greenland
Association football clubs established in 1937
Handball clubs in Greenland